The Old Men at the Zoo is a novel written by Angus Wilson, first published in 1961 by Secker and Warburg and by Penguin books in 1964.  It was adapted, with many changes—nuclear bombing of London, not present in the novel, is added—into a 1983 BBC Television serial by the scriptwriter Troy Kennedy Martin. The book deals with events before a nuclear attack on London during a (presumably) limited nuclear war, which results in the imposition of a later post-apocalyptic pan-European dystopian dictatorship, until rescue arrives for the prisoners at the zoo, transformed into a concentration camp.

References

1961 British novels
1961 science fiction novels
BBC Television shows
Novels by Angus Wilson
British novels adapted into television shows
Television shows based on British novels
British post-apocalyptic novels
Secker & Warburg books
1983 in British television
1980s British drama television series
English-language television shows
Post-apocalyptic television series